Nicolas Sachy (born 23 October 1967) is a French former professional footballer who played as a goalkeeper. In his career, he played for Alençon, Dunkerque, Angers, and Sedan.

Post-playing career 
From 2002 to 2013, Sachy was a communication director at his former club Sedan. In October 2014, he became the manager of Le Rétro, a bar in Charleville-Mézières.

Personal life 
Nicolas is from a family of footballers; his father  and his brother Laurent are both former footballers.

Honours 
Sedan

 Coupe de France runner-up: 1998–99

Notes

References 

1967 births
Living people
Sportspeople from Dunkirk
French footballers
Association football goalkeepers
US Alençon players
USL Dunkerque players
Angers SCO players
CS Sedan Ardennes players
French Division 4 (1978–1993) players
Ligue 2 players
Ligue 1 players
Championnat National players
CS Sedan Ardennes non-playing staff
Footballers from Hauts-de-France